Hajra Khan is a Pakistani television and film actress. She appeared in various television plays and made her debut in film with 2018 movie Pinky Memsaab. Her debut series was Buri Aurat by Javed Fazli aired on Geo TV.

Personal life 
Khan was born in Quetta to a Pashtun family. She studied Business Management at the Dublin Business College, Ireland.

Filmography

Film

Television

References

External links 

Pakistani film actresses
Pakistani television actresses
Living people
People from Quetta
Date of birth missing (living people)
21st-century Pakistani actresses
Year of birth missing (living people)